The Xiaomi Mi 10T (sold in China as Redmi K30S Ultra), Xiaomi Mi 10T Lite and Xiaomi Mi 10T Pro are Android-based smartphones developed by Xiaomi Inc. announced on 30 September 2020, while the Xiaomi Mi 10i (sold in China as Redmi Note 9 Pro 5G), which is based on Mi 10T Lite but with a 108 MP camera, was announced on 5 January 2021.

Design 
Smartphones use Gorilla Glass 5 for the screen and back panel. The Mi 10T and Mi 10T Pro are built with an anodized aluminum frame while Mi 10T Lite and Mi 10i with plastic frame. The fingerprint sensor is integrated into the power button on the right edge below the volume rocker, while the bottom edge has the USB-C port, a loudspeaker and the SIM card slot. The display has a circular cutout in the upper left-hand corner for the front-facing camera; the rear camera array is located in a rectangular protrusion. Mi 10T and Mi 10T Pro have Cosmic Black and Lunar Silver color options, with an additional Aurora Blue color for the Mi 10T Pro.

Specifications

Hardware 
The Mi 10T and Mi 10T Pro are powered by the Snapdragon 865 processor with the Adreno GPU while the Mi 10T Lite and Mi 10i are powered by Snapdragon 750G. Storage on Mi 10T and 10T Pro is non-expandable UFS 3.1, while the storage on 10T Lite and Mi 10i is expandable UFS 2.1 or 2.2; the Mi 10T has 128 GB, the Mi 10T Lite and MI 10i has 64 GB or 128 GB while the Mi 10T Pro has 128 or 256 GB. The Mi 10T has 6 or 8 GB of RAM, the Mi 10T Lite and Mi 10i have 4 or 6 GB of RAM while the Mi 10T Pro has 8 GB of RAM; both Mi 10T and 10T Pro have LPDDR5, while Mi 10T Lite and Mi 10i have LPDDR4X. Both phones feature a 6.67-inch (169 mm) FHD+ IPS LCD with HDR10+ support. The display is the same size as on the Mi 10 and Mi 10 Pro, but is not curved. Mi 10T and 10T Pro has an adaptive 144 Hz refresh rate branded as Smart AdaptiveSync Display which can detect static images and animations. The Mi 10T Lite also has that AdaptiveSync feature, but with a 120 Hz refresh rate. There are intermediate modes at 30 Hz, 48 Hz, 50 Hz, 60 Hz, or 90 Hz depending on the content being displayed, with 60, 90, and 144/120 Hz options in settings. The display also has MEMC (Motion Estimation, Motion Compensation) akin to "motion smoothening" on high-end TVs. The battery capacity is 5000 mAh; wired fast charging is supported over USB-C at up to 33 W. The Mi 10T and Mi 10T Pro have a triple camera setup. The wide lens uses a 64 MP sensor on the Mi 10T and a 108 MP sensor on the Mi 10T Pro; the 13 MP ultrawide sensor and 5 MP macro sensor are shared. Both are capable of recording video at 8K resolution. The front-facing camera uses a 20 MP sensor.

Software 
The Mi 10T, 10T Lite, Mi 10T Pro, and Mi 10i run on Android 10, with Xiaomi's custom MIUI 12 skin. They were updated to MIUI 13 based on Android 12.

Censorship
In September 2021, the Lithuanian Ministry of National Defence recommended against purchasing or using Chinese mobile phones. It asked that the existing phones should be thrown away after the defence ministry's National Cyber Security Centre found that Xiaomi devices have built-in censorship capabilities that can be turned on remotely. Xiaomi phones sold in Europe had a built-in ability to detect and censor terms such as "Free Tibet", "Long live Taiwan independence" or "democracy movement". This capability was discovered in Xiaomi’s flagship phone Mi 10T 5G. The list of terms which could be censored by the Xiaomi phone's system apps, including the default internet browser, in September 2021 includes 449 terms in Chinese and the list was continuously updated.

The National Cyber Security Centre of Lithuania also reported that the phone sends usage data to a server in Singapore.

References 

Android (operating system) devices
Mobile phones introduced in 2020
Mobile phones with multiple rear cameras
Mobile phones with 8K video recording
Mobile phones with infrared transmitter
Discontinued flagship smartphones
Xiaomi smartphones
Phablets